Economy is a borough in Beaver County, Pennsylvania, United States. The population was 9,079 at the 2020 census. It is a part of the Pittsburgh metropolitan area.

History
Economy was established in 1825 by a Harmonist society, and named to indicate the principles of their government and their habits of living.

Geography
Economy is located at  (40.638466, -80.184891).

Surrounding neighborhoods
Economy borders seven municipalities, including New Sewickley Township to the north, Harmony Township and Baden to the west, Conway to the northwest, and the Allegheny County neighborhoods of Marshall Township to the east, Franklin Park to the southeast and Bell Acres to the south.

Demographics

As of the census of 2000, there were 9,363 people, 3,528 households, and 2,854 families residing in the borough. The population density was 529.0 people per square mile (204.2/km2). There were 3,629 housing units at an average density of 205.0 per square mile (79.2/km2). The racial makeup of the borough was 98.33% White, 0.66% African American, 0.10% Native American, 0.28% Asian, 0.13% from other races, and 0.50% from two or more races. Hispanic or Latino of any race were 0.44% of the population.

There were 3,528 households, out of which 30.8% had children under the age of 18 living with them, 72.1% were married couples living together, 5.9% had a female householder with no husband present, and 19.1% were non-families. 16.7% of all households were made up of individuals, and 8.0% had someone living alone who was 65 years of age or older. The average household size was 2.65 and the average family size was 2.99.

In the borough the population was spread out, with 22.2% under the age of 18, 6.5% from 18 to 24, 28.1% from 25 to 44, 29.6% from 45 to 64, and 13.6% who were 65 years of age or older. The median age was 42 years. For every 100 females there were 99.6 males. For every 100 females age 18 and over, there were 98.0 males.

The median income for a household in the borough was $52,446, and the median income for a family was $60,081. Males had a median income of $41,756 versus $27,121 for females. The per capita income for the borough was $22,453. About 2.0% of families and 2.4% of the population were below the poverty line, including 2.2% of those under age 18 and 5.8% of those age 65 or over.

Education
Children in Economy are served by the Ambridge Area School District. The current schools serving Economy are:
 Economy Elementary School –  grades K-5
 Ambridge Area Middle School – grades 6-8
 Ambridge Area High School – grades 9-12

See also
 Old Economy Village
 Ambridge, Pennsylvania
 Harmony Society
 George Rapp
 Harmony, Pennsylvania
 New Harmony, Indiana

References

Populated places established in 1827
Boroughs in Beaver County, Pennsylvania
1827 establishments in Pennsylvania